Bloléquin is a town in western Ivory Coast. It is a sub-prefecture of and the seat of Bloléquin Department in Cavally Region, Montagnes District. Bloléquin is also a commune.

In 2021, the population of the sub-prefecture of Bloléquin was 123,133.

Villages
The villages of the sub-prefecture of Bloléquin and their population in 2014 are:
 Blédi-Diéya (2 148)
 Bloléquin (13 635)
 Goya (12 447)
 Guéya (1 528)
 Médibli (573)
 Yoya (1 041)

References

Sub-prefectures of Cavally Region
Communes of Cavally Region